The 2021 Appalachian State Mountaineers football team represented Appalachian State University during the 2021 NCAA Division I FBS football season. The Mountaineers were led by second-year head coach Shawn Clark. Appalachian State played their home games at Kidd Brewer Stadium on the school's Boone, North Carolina, campus, and competed as a member of the East Division of the Sun Belt Conference.

Previous season
The Mountaineers finished the 2020 season 9–3, 6–2 in Sun Belt play to finish in second place in the West Division. The Mountaineers, finishing third overall in the Sun Belt, were invited to play in the inaugural Myrtle Beach Bowl. They played North Texas and won their sixth overall bowl game brutally by the score of 56–28.

2021 NFL Draft

Preseason

Recruiting class

|}
Source:

Award watch lists
Listed in the order that they were released

Preseason

Sources:

Sun Belt coaches poll
The Sun Belt coaches poll was released on July 20, 2021. The Mountaineers were picked to finish tied for first in the East Division and third overall in the conference.

Sun Belt Preseason All-Conference teams

Offense

1st team
Camerun Peoples – Running Back, JR
Baer Hunter – Offensive Lineman, SR
Cooper Hodges – Offensive Lineman, JR

2nd team
Daetrich Harrington – Running Back, SR
Thomas Hennigan – Wide Receiver, SR

Defense

1st team
Demetrius Taylor – Defensive Lineman, SR
D'Marco Jackson – Linebacker, SR
Shaun Jolly – Defensive Back, SR

2nd team
Brendan Harrington – Linebacker, JR

Personnel

Schedule
The 2021 schedule had 6 home, 5 away, and one neutral game in the regular season. The Mountaineers traveled to Sun Belt foes Georgia State, Louisiana, Arkansas State, and Troy. The Mountaineers hosted Sun Belt foes Coastal Carolina, Louisiana–Monroe, South Alabama, and Georgia Southern.

Appalachian State hosted two of the four non-conference opponents at Kidd Brewer Stadium, Elon, from NCAA Division I FCS and Marshall of the Conference USA, traveled to Miami (FL) of the ACC, and played a neutral site game against East Carolina of The American at Bank of America Stadium.

Schedule Source:

Game summaries

vs. East Carolina

at Miami (FL)

Elon

Marshall

at Georgia State

at Louisiana

Coastal Carolina

Louisiana–Monroe

at Arkansas State

South Alabama

at Troy

Georgia Southern

at Louisiana (SBC Championship)

vs. Western Kentucky (Boca Raton Bowl)

References

Appalachian State
Appalachian State Mountaineers football seasons
Appalachian State Mountaineers football